Chabab Ahly Bordj Bou Arréridj, known as CA Bord Bou Arréridj or simply CABBA for short, is an Algerian football club based in Bordj Bou Arreridj, founded in 1931. The club colours are yellow and black. Their home stadium, 20 August 1955 Stadium, has a capacity of 15,000 spectators. The club is currently playing in the Inter-Régions Division.

Honours

Domestic competitions
 Algerian Ligue Professionnelle 2
Champion (3): 1998, 2000–01, 2011–12
 Algerian Cup
Runner-up (1): 2008–09

Regional competitions
 Arab Champions League
Quarter Final: 2006–07

Personnel

Current technical staff

Notable players
Below are the notable former players who have represented CA Bordj Bou Arréridj in league and international competition since the club's foundation in 1931. To appear in the section below, a player must have played in at least 100 official matches for the club or represented the national team for which the player is eligible during his stint with CA Bordj Bou Arréridj or following his departure.

For all notable CA Bordj Bou Arréridj players with Wikipedia articles, see :Category:CA Bordj Bou Arréridj players.

 Abderahmane Hachoud
 Merouane Kial
 Jaime Linares
 Alhassane Issoufou

Managers
 Azzedine Aït Djoudi (2005)
  Petre Gigiu  (2005)
 Ladislas Lozano (26 Jan 2011 – 31 Dec 2011)
 Toufik Rouabah (27 June 2012 – 1 Oct 2012)
 Rachid Bouarrata (Oct 2012–1?)
 Abdelaziz Abbès (2 Oct 2012 – 20 Jan 2013)
 Abdelkader Amrani (21 Jan 2013 – 30 June 2013)
 Rachid Belhout (2 July 2013 – 20 Oct 2013)
 Nabil Kouki (5 Nov 2013 – 16 Dec 2013)
 Mustapha Biskri (18 Dec 2013 – 14 March 2014)

Rival Clubs
  ES Setif (Derby)
  MC El Eulma (Rivalry)
  MO Béjaïa (Rivalry)
  AS Aïn M'lila (Rivalry)

References

External links

 
Association football clubs established in 1931
CA Bordj Bou Arreridj
Football clubs in Algeria
Algerian Ligue Professionnelle 1 clubs
Algerian Ligue 2 clubs
1931 establishments in Algeria
Sports clubs in Algeria